Naturally, Sadie is a Canadian teen comedy-drama television series that aired between June 24, 2005 and August 26, 2007 on Family Channel. The series ran for three seasons, airing a total of 65 episodes.

Series overview

Episodes

Season 1 (2005)

Season 2 (2006–07)

Season 3 (2007)

References

External links
 
  

Lists of Canadian children's television series episodes
Lists of sitcom episodes